Kamra Cantonment is a cantonment adjacent to the Kamra Airbase in Attock District, Punjab province, Pakistan.

References

Cantonments of Pakistan